19 (nineteen) is the natural number following 18 and preceding 20. It is a prime number.

Mathematics 

 is the eighth prime number, and forms a sexy prime with 13, a twin prime with 17, and a cousin prime with 23. It is the third full reptend prime, the fifth central trinomial coefficient, and the seventh Mersenne prime exponent. It is also the second Keith number, and more specifically the first Keith prime. 

 R19 is the second base-10 repunit prime, short for the number 1111111111111111111. 

 19 is the maximum number of fourth powers needed to sum up to any natural number, and in the context of Waring's problem, 19 is the fourth value of g(k).

 The sum of the squares of the first 19 primes is divisible by 19. 

 19 is the sixth Heegner number. 67 and 163, respectively the 19th and 38th prime numbers, are the two largest Heegner numbers, of nine total.

 19 is the third centered triangular number as well as the third centered hexagonal number.
 The 19th triangular number is 190, equivalently the sum of the first 19 non-zero integers, that is also the sixth centered nonagonal number. 
19 is the first number in an infinite sequence of numbers in decimal whose digits start with 1 and have trailing 9's, that form triangular numbers containing trailing zeroes in proportion to 9s present in the original number; i.e. 19900 is the 199th triangular number, and 1999000 is the 1999th. 
Like 19, 199 and 1999 are also both prime, as are 199999 and 19999999. In fact, a number of the form 19n, where n is the number of nines that terminate in the number, is prime for: 
n = {1, 2, 3, 5, 7, 26, 27, 53, 147, 236, 248, 386, 401}.

 19, alongside 109, 1009, and 10009, are all prime (with 109 also full reptend), and form part of a sequence of numbers where inserting a digit inside the previous term produces the next smallest prime possible, up to scale, with the composite number 9 as root. 100019 is the next such smallest prime number, by the insertion of a 1.
Numbers of the form 10n9 equivalent to 10x + 9 with x = n + 1, where n is the number of zeros in the term, are prime for n = {0, 1, 2, 3, 8, 17, 21, 44, 48, 55, 68, 145, 201, 271, 2731, 4563}, and probably prime for n = {31811, 43187, 48109, 92691}. 

 The Collatz sequence for nine requires nineteen steps to return back to one, more than any other number below it. On the other hand, nineteen requires twenty steps, like eighteen. Less than ten thousand, only thirty-one other numbers require nineteen steps to return back to one: 
{56, 58, 60, 61, 352, 360, 362, 368, 369, 372, 373, 401, 402, 403, 2176, ..., and 2421}. 

 19 is the first prime number that is not a permutable prime, as its reverse (91) is composite. 19 x 91 = 1729, the first Hardy-Ramanujan number or taxicab number, also a Harshad number, as it's divisible by the sum of its digits, 19. 91 is also the fourth centered nonagonal number.

 The only nontrivial normal magic hexagon is composed of nineteen cells, where every diagonal of consecutive hexagons has sums equal to 38, or twice 19. 

 A hexaflexagon is a strip of nineteen alternating triangular faces that can flex into a regular hexagon, such that any two of six colorings on triangles can be oriented to align on opposite sides of the folded figure.

 The projective special linear group L2(19) represents the abstract symmetry structure of the 57-cell: a unique or universal abstract polytope in the fourth dimension with a total of one hundred and seventy-one edges and vertices (171 = 19 x 9), and fifty-seven hemi-icosahedral cells that are self-dual. 

 There are nineteen Coxeter groups of non-prismatic uniform honeycombs in the fourth dimension: five Coxeter honeycomb groups exist in Euclidean space, while the other fourteen Coxeter groups are compact and paracompact hyperbolic honeycomb groups. 
 There are also specifically nineteen uniform honeycombs from the Euclidean  tesseractic honeycomb group in 4-space. In 5-space, there are nineteen uniform polytopes with  simplex symmetry. 

 There are infinitely many finite-volume Vinberg polytopes up through dimension nineteen, which generate hyperbolic tilings with degenerate simplex quadrilateral pyramidal domains, as well as prismatic domains and otherwise.
 On the other hand, Vinberg polytopes of lowest rank  mirrors exist up through the seventeenth dimension, where there exists a unique figure with nineteen facets. It is expressed with the simple Dynkin diagram,  .

 19 is the eighth consecutive supersingular prime. It is the middle indexed member in the sequence of fifteen such primes that divide the order of the Friendly Giant, the largest sporadic group: {2, 3, 5, 7, 11, 13, 17, 19, 23, 29, 31, 41, 47, 59, 71}.

If the Tits group is included as a non-strict group of Lie type, then there are nineteen finite simple groups that are not sporadic groups. In the Happy Family, nineteen of twenty-six sporadic groups are subquotients of the Friendly Giant, which is also its own subquotient.

Science

 19 is the atomic number of potassium.
 19 years is very close to 235 lunations. See Metonic cycle.
 COVID-19 is the shortened name of Coronavirus disease 2019, the cause of the global pandemic that began in 2019.
 The James Webb Space Telescope's optical elements are in an array of 19 hexagons, wherein 18 segmented primary mirrors focus light into a centered secondary mirror situated above the collecting mirrors, that in-turn reflects back onto the telescope's central imagers. It is a shape akin to the order-3 magic hexagon.

Religion

Islam
 The number of angels guarding Hell ("Hellfire") ("Saqar") according to the Qur'an: "Over it are nineteen" (74:30), after which the Qur'an describes this number as being "a trial for those who disbelieve" (74:31), a sign for people of the scripture to be "convinced" (74:31) and that believers "will increase in faith" (74:31) due to it.
 The Number of Verse and Sura together in the Qur'an which announces Jesus son of Maryam's (Mary's) birth (Qur'an 19:19).
 A group called United Submitter International claim the Quran has mathematical structure based on the number 19. The gematrical value of WAHD = 6+1+8+4=19, Wahd means 'One' (God) to the first verse (1:1), known as Bas-malah, consists of 19 Arabic letters or the Quran consists of 114 (19x6) surat etc.

Baháʼí faith
In the Bábí and Baháʼí Faiths, a group of 19 is called a Váhid, a Unity (Arabic: واحد wāhid, "one"). The numerical value of this word in the Abjad numeral system is 19.
 The Baháʼí calendar is structured such that a year contains 19 months of 19 days each (along with the intercalary period of Ayyám-i-Há), as well as a 19-year cycle and a 361-year (19x19) supercycle.
The Báb and his disciples formed a group of 19.
There were 19 Apostles of Bahá'u'lláh.

Celtic paganism
19 is a sacred number of the goddess Brigid because it is said to represent the 19-year cycle of the Great Celtic Year and the amount of time it takes the Moon to coincide with the winter solstice.

Music
"19" is a 1985 song by Paul Hardcastle, including sampled soundbites taken from a documentary about the Vietnam War in which 19 is claimed to have been the average age of United States soldiers killed in the conflict. The song was parodied by British satirist Rory Bremner under the pseudonym 'The Commentators,' as N-n-nineteen, Not Out, the title referring to the batting average of David Gower, the England cricket captain, during his side's risible performance against the West Indies in 1984 when they lost 5–0.

"I Was Only Nineteen" by the Australian group Redgum reached number one on the Australian charts in 1983. In 2005 a hip hop version of the song was produced by The Herd.
19 is the name of Adele's 2008 debut album, so named since she was 19 years old at the time.
"Hey Nineteen" is a song by American jazz rock band Steely Dan, on the 1980 album Gaucho.
Nineteen has been used as an alternative to twelve for a division of the octave into equal parts. This idea goes back to Salinas in the sixteenth century, and is interesting in part because it gives a system of meantone tuning, being close to 1/3 comma meantone. See 19 equal temperament.
Some organs use the 19th harmonic to approximate a minor third.

Literature
Stephen King's eight-book epic The Dark Tower saga employs the number 19 in books The Dark Tower: The Gunslinger, The Dark Tower V: Wolves of the Calla, The Dark Tower VI: Song of Susannah, The Dark Tower VII: The Dark Tower, and The Wind Through the Keyhole as a mysterious and important number. They refer to the "ka-tet of 19", "Directive Nineteen," many names add up to 19, 19 seems to permeate every aspect of Roland and his traveler's lives. In addition, the number ends up being a powerful key.
In Jodi Picoult's bestselling book Nineteen Minutes, the number 19 is referenced multiple times.  It is most commonly referenced when referring to the main subject of the book, the school shooting rampage that took place over a span of 19 minutes.
The novel S. by Doug Dorst uses 19 and its multiples throughout. S is the 19th letter of the alphabet.

Games

The game of Go is played on a grid of 19×19 lines (though variants can be played on grids of other sizes).
Though the maximum score for a cribbage hand is 29, there is no combination of cards that adds up to 19 points. Many cribbage players, therefore, jokingly refer to a zero-point hand as "a 19 hand".
In the base version of Settlers of Catan there are 19 hexagonal pieces that can be randomly or intentionally placed to form the board.

Age 19
In four countries, 19 is the age of majority.
In two countries, 19 is the minimum legal drinking age.
In three countries, 19 is the minimum legal smoking age.

In sports
 In golf, the '19th hole' is the clubhouse bar and in match play, if there is a tie after 18 holes, an extra hole(s) is played. In miniature golf it is an extra hole on which the winner earns an instant prize.

Other fields 

 The 19th Amendment to the United States Constitution gave American women the right to vote. 
 The Vietnam War spanned over 19 years, from November 1955 to April 1975.

References

External links

Number 19 at the Database of Number Correlations
Prime Curios for the number 19

Integers